Carrapatelo Dam is a concrete gravity dam on the Douro, where the river forms the border line between the districts of Porto and Viseu. It is located in the municipalities of Marco de Canaveses, in Porto District, and Cinfães, Viseu District, Portugal.

Construction of the dam began in 1964. The dam was completed in 1972. It is owned by Companhia Portuguesa de Produção de Electricidade (CPPE).

Dam
Carrapatelo Dam is a 57 m tall (height above foundation) and 400 m long gravity dam with a crest altitude of 55 m. The volume of the dam is 190,000 m³. The spillway is part of the dam body (maximum discharge 22,000 m³/s). There is also a bottom outlet.

Reservoir
At full reservoir level of 46.5 m the reservoir of the dam has a surface area of 9.52 km² and its total capacity is 148.4 mio. m³. The active capacity is 9 (15,6 or 16) mio. m³.

Power plant 
The run-of-the-river hydroelectric power plant went operational in 1971. It is owned by CPPE, but operated by EDP. The plant has a nameplate capacity of 201 (180) MW. Its average annual generation is 806.1 (783, 870.6 or 882) GWh.

The power station contains 3 Kaplan turbine-generators with 63.4 MW each in a dam powerhouse. The turbine rotation is 115.4 rpm. The minimum hydraulic head is 20 m, the maximum 37 m. Maximum flow per turbine is 290 m³/s.

The first 2 machines went operational in 1971, the third in 1972. The turbines were provided by Kværner, the generators by Brown, Boveri & Cie.

Lock

On the right side of the dam is a lock, which can handle ships with the following maximum properties: 83 m in length, 11.40 m on the beam, 3.8 m load-draught and a cargo capacity of 2500 tons.  The water level change through the lock is about 35 m.

See also

 List of power stations in Portugal
 List of dams and reservoirs in Portugal

References

Dams in Portugal
Hydroelectric power stations in Portugal
Gravity dams
Dams completed in 1972
Energy infrastructure completed in 1972
1972 establishments in Portugal
Buildings and structures in Porto District
Dams on the Douro River
Locks of Portugal
Run-of-the-river power stations